The Universal Multimedia Access (UMA) addresses the delivery of multimedia resources under different and varying network conditions, diverse terminal equipment capabilities, specific user or creator preferences and needs and usage environment conditions. UMA refers to the truly ubiquitous access to and consumption of multimedia content, aiming at guaranteeing unrestricted access to multimedia content:
 from any device;
 through any network;
 independently of the original content format;
 with guarantees and efficiently and
 satisfying user preferences and usage environment conditions.

Requirements
The fulfilment of UMA requires that:

 Content is remotely accessible and searchable;
 Availability of useful descriptions about the content;
 Availability of useful descriptions about the context (e.g., knowledge about the terminal capabilities);
 Existence of content mediation/delivery systems able to use the above information to provide the intended value to their users independently of location, type of terminal devices being used or network connections, regardless of the format of the content, respecting user preferences, environmental conditions and content owners and usage rights.

Approach
One feasible approach to implement UMA, is to develop context-aware systems that use the content and context descriptions to decide upon the need to adapt the content before delivering it to the end-user. The use of open ontologies and standards to structure, represent and convey those descriptions as well as to specify the kind of adaptation operations is vital for the success of UMA. This is especially true in loosely coupled environments such as the Internet, where heterogeneous end-users devices, varied content formats, repositories and networking technologies co-exist. Standards from the W3C such as OWL (Web Ontology Language) or CC/PP (Content Capability/Preferences Profile) and from ISO/IEC such as MPEG-7 and especially MPEG-21, are well-suited for the implementation of UMA-enabler systems.

References

Telecommunication services